The 303rd Air Refueling Squadron is an inactive United States Air Force unit. It was last assigned to the 499th Air Refueling Wing at Kindley AFB, Bermuda, where it was inactivated on 15 June 1963.

The squadron was first active as the 303rd Transport Squadron, an airlift element of the India-China Wing, Air Transport Command.  The 303rd flew missions over the Hump before being disbanded when Air Transport Command abandoned the traditional squadron and group organization for its operations in the China Burma India Theater.

The second predecessor of the squadron was the 483rd Bombardment Squadron, a very heavy Boeing B-29 Superfortress squadron that flew missions from Tinian against Japan before moving to the Philippines, where it was inactivated in 1946.

The unit was activated a third time as the 303rd Air Refueling Squadron, and served during the Cold War to support Strategic Air Command bombers.  For most of its active life, the squadron operated from a forward base in the middle Atlantic to support reflex deployments and maintained readiness to support Emergency War Order missions.

In 1985, the United States Air Force consolidated three squadrons, but they have not been active since the consolidation.

History

Flying the Hump

The 303rd Transport Squadron was activated in India in late spring 1943.  It operated Douglas C-47 Skytrain and Curtiss C-46 Commando transports in the China-Burma-India theater for the India-China Wing, Air Transport Command in 1943.  It flew supplies, equipment and personnel over the Hump from the Assam Valley of India to airfields in southeast China, primarily to support Fourteenth Air Force combat operations.   It was a short-lived organization for it was disbanded in December 1943 and replaced, along with other elements of the 30th Transport Group, by Station 9, India-China Wing, Air Transport Command.

B-29 Superfortress operations against Japan
The 483rd Bombardment Squadron was activated in March 1944 as a Boeing B-29 Superfortress very heavy bombardment squadron.  The squadron trained at airfields in the midwest under Second Air Force.  When training was completed the unit moved to North Field, Tinian in the Mariana Islands of the Central Pacific.  There it became an element of XXI Bomber Command.  Its mission was the strategic bombardment of the Japanese Home Islands and the destruction of Japan's war-making capability.

Upon arrival in the Pacific, the unit flew "shakedown" missions against Japanese targets on Moen Island, Truk, and other points in the Carolines and Marianas.  The squadron began combat missions over Japan on 25 February 1945 with a firebombing mission over Northeast Tokyo.  The squadron continued to participate in wide area firebombing attack, but the first ten-day blitz resulted in the Army Air Forces running out of incendiary bombs. Until then the squadron flew conventional strategic bombing missions using high explosive bombs.

The squadron continued attacking urban areas with incendiary raids until the end of the war in August 1945, attacking major Japanese cities and causing massive destruction of urbanized areas.  The 483rd also conducted raids against strategic objectives, bombing aircraft factories, chemical plants, oil refineries, and other targets in Japan. The squadron flew its last combat missions on 14 August when hostilities ended.  Afterwards, its B-29s carried relief supplies to Allied prisoner of war camps in Japan and Manchuria.

The squadron was largely demobilized on Tinian during the fall of 1945.  It remained in Western Pacific as part of Twentieth Air Force.  The 483rd moved to Clark Field in the Philippines along with the 313th Bombardment Wing in March 1946. It was inactivated at Clark in June.  Its low-hour aircraft were flown to storage depots in the United States.

Strategic Air Command
The 303rd Air Refueling Squadron was activated in 1951 at Davis-Monthan Air Force Base, Arizona, but was inactivated seven months later.  It was activated again in 1953.  In February 1956, the squadron moved from Davis-Monthan to Kindley Air Force Base, Bermuda and was relieved from the 303rd Bombardment Wing,  At Kindley it was positioned to support Boeing B-47 Stratojet aircraft deploying to Europe and Morocco on Operation Reflex and to provide forward refueling in the event of war. While stationed at Kindley the squadron was assigned to several headquarters located in the United States.  The 303rd performed air refueling to support SAC and USAF operations on a worldwide basis until it was inactivated in 1963 with the phaseout of the propeller-driven KC-97 from SAC.

Lineage
303rd Transport Squadron
 Constituted as 303rd Transport Squadron, c. 4 June 1943
 Activated on 21 June 1943
 Disbanded on 1 December 1943
 Reconstituted 19 September 1985 and consolidated with the 483rd Bombardment Squadron and the 303rd Air Refueling Squadron as 303rd Air Refueling Squadron (remained inactive)

483rd Bombardment Squadron
 Constituted as 483rd Bombardment Squadron, Very Heavy on 28 Feb 1944
 Activated on 11 Mar 1944
 Inactivated on 30 Jun 1946
 Consolidated on 19 September 1985 with the 303rd Transport Squadron and the 303rd Air Refueling Squadron as 303rd Air Refueling Squadron (remained inactive)

303rd Air Refueling Squadron
 Constituted as 303rd Air Refueling Squadron, Medium on 4 April 1951
 Activated on 4 September 1951
 Inactivated 8 April 1952
 Activated on 18 February 1953
 Inactivated on 15 Jun 1963
 Consolidated on 19 September 1985 with the 483rd Bombardment Squadron and the 303rd Transport Squadron as the 303rd Air Refueling Squadron, Heavy (remained inactive)

Assignments
 30th Transport Group, 21 June 1943 – 1 December 1943
 505th Bombardment Group, 11 March 1944 – 30 June 1946
 303rd Bombardment Group, 4 April 1951 – 8 April 1952
 303rd Bombardment Wing, 18 February 1953
 Second Air Force, 1 February 1956
 38th Air Division,  1 January 1959
 823rd Air Division,  1 October 1959
 19th Bombardment Wing,  1 November 1959
 4050th Air Refueling Wing, 1 April 1961
 499th Air Refueling Wing, 1 January–15 June 1963

Stations
 Mohanbari Airport, Assam, India, 21 June 1943 – 1 December 1943
 Dalhart Army Air Field, Texas, 11 March  1944
 Harvard Army Airfield, Nebraska, 12 March 1944 – 6 November 1944
 North Field, Tinian, Mariana Islands, 24 December 1944 – 5 March 1946
 Clark Field, Luzon, Philippines, 14 March 1946 – 30 June 1946
 Davis-Monthan AFB, Arizona, 4 April 1951 – 8 April 1952
 Davis-Monthan AFB, Arizona, 18 February 1953
 Kindley AFB, Bermuda, 1 February 1956 – 15 June 1963

Aircraft
 Douglas C-47 Skytrain, 1943
 Curtiss C-46 Commando, 1943
 Boeing B-17 Flying Fortress, 1944
 Boeing B-29 Superfortress, 1944–1946
 KB-29M Superfortress tanker, 1951–1952
 KC-97F Stratotanker, 1953-1956 (Also KC-97G)
 KC-97G Stratotanker, 1956–1959; 1959–1963

Awards and Campaigns

References

Notes

Bibliography

 
 AF Pamphlet 900-2, Unit Decorations, Awards and Campaign Participation Credits Department of the Air Force, Washington, DC, 15 Jun 1971, p.

External links

Air refueling squadrons of the United States Air Force
Military units and formations established in 1951
Units and formations of Strategic Air Command
1951 establishments in the United States